A Regular Scout is a 1926 American silent Western film directed by David Kirkland and starring Fred Thomson, Olive Hasbrouck, and William Courtright.

Cast

References

Bibliography
 Donald W. McCaffrey & Christopher P. Jacobs. Guide to the Silent Years of American Cinema. Greenwood Publishing, 1999.

External links

1926 films
1926 Western (genre) films
American black-and-white films
Films directed by David Kirkland
Film Booking Offices of America films
Silent American Western (genre) films
1920s English-language films
1920s American films